KHGV-LP (99.7 FM) is a non-profit radio station licensed to serve the community of Houston, Texas. The station is owned by Garden Villas Community Association, Inc. It airs a variety radio format.

The station was assigned the KHGV-LP call letters by the Federal Communications Commission on February 5, 2015.

References

External links
 Official Website
 

HGV-LP
HGV-LP
Radio stations established in 2015
2015 establishments in Texas
Variety radio stations in the United States